Jürgen Bähringer (born 19 August 1950) is a former East German football player. He appeared first as a midfielder in his career and was later a sweeper.

Bähringer won one cap for East Germany, and was part of the silver medal-winning squad at the 1980 Olympics.

At club level, he made 350 league appearances for FC Karl-Marx-Stadt. Bähringer was runners-up with his side in the 1983 East German Cup.

References

External links
 
 
 

1959 births
Living people
People from Greiz
German footballers
East German footballers
Footballers from Thuringia
East Germany international footballers
Olympic footballers of East Germany
Association football midfielders
Footballers at the 1980 Summer Olympics
DDR-Oberliga players
Chemnitzer FC players
Olympic medalists in football
Olympic silver medalists for East Germany
Medalists at the 1980 Summer Olympics
Recipients of the Patriotic Order of Merit in bronze